This page lists Japan-related articles with romanized titles beginning with the letter D. For names of people, please list by surname (i.e., "Tarō Yamada" should be listed under "Y", not "T"). Please also ignore particles (e.g. "a", "an", "the") when listing articles (i.e., "A City with No People" should be listed under "City").

Da
Da Pump
Dabo
Dabura
Dai-Ichi Kangyo Bank
Akitaro Daichi
Daiei
Daiei, Tottori
Daihatsu
Daikon
Daimoku
Daimyō
Daisen, Tottori
Daishi
Daitō, Osaka
Daito Bunka University
Daito-ryu aiki-jujutsu
Daitō, Shimane
Daitō, Shizuoka
Daiwa, Hiroshima
Daiwa, Shimane
Liza Dalby
Dan Hibiki
Dance Dance Revolution
Dango
Darius Gaiden
Darkstalkers
Daruma doll
Dahrumasan ga Koronda
Darunia
Dashi
Data East
Date, Hokkaidō
Kimiko Date
Date Masamune
Dating sim
Datsun 1500, 1600, 2000 Roadster
Datsun 510
Dazai Osamu
Dazaifu, Fukuoka

De
Deba bōchō
Arudou Debito
Dejima
Deko Boko Friends
Deku Scrubs
Deku Tree
Aiguille Delaz
Democratic Party of Japan
Demographics of Japan
Deployment of Japanese troops to Iraq
Destroy All Monsters
Detective Conan
Devilman
Dewa Province

Di
Diana (Sailor Moon)
Diddy Kong
Diet of Japan
Digimon
Digivolve
Dir en grey
Disability policy in Japan
Distance (film)
District
Districts of Japan

Dn
D.N.Angel
DNA²

Do
Do As Infinity
DoCo
Doctor Eggman
Doctor Yellow
Dogen Zenji
Dōgo Onsen
Takako Doi
Toshiyuki Doi
Doi, Ehime
Kenji Doihara
DoJa
Dojin game
Dōjinshi
Dojo
Domo-kun
Domon Ken Award
Kōichi Dōmoto
Tsuyoshi Dōmoto
Donabe
Donald Keene
Donari, Tokushima
Donburi
Donkey Kong
Doolittle Raid
Doraemon
Dororo
Doshin the Giant
Doshisha University
Doshu
Double Dragon
Douglas MacArthur

Dr
Dr. Gero
Dr. Mario
Dr. Slump
Dragon Ash
Dragon Ball
Dragon Ball (artifact)
Dragon Ball (original series)
Dragon Ball GT
Dragon Ball Z
Dragon Half
Dragon Quest
Dragon Quest Monsters
Dragon Quest VII
Último Dragón
Drakengard
Dreams Come True (band)

Du
Duck Hunt
Dungeon Magic

Dy
Dynasty Warriors

D